The Sri Lanka Sama Samaja Party (SLSSP) was formed in 1982, when  the LSSP split over the question of a coalition with the Sri Lanka Freedom Party (SLFP).

Anil Moonesinghe, the leader of the party, charged that the LSSP had been taken over by the 'Bolshevik-Leninist' Bolshevik Samasamaja Party faction and held that the SLSSP represented the true Sama Samajist tradition. Among the other leaders were Cholomondely Goonewardena, G.E.H. Perera, Wilfred Senanayake and Percy Wickremasekera.

Scuffles broke out between the LSSP and the SLSSP at the joint May Day procession that year.

The SLSSP co-operated with the Sirimavo Bandaranaike wing of the SLFP, whereas the LSSP wished to work with the faction led by Maithripala Senanayake and Anura Bandaranaike, which had split off. The SLSSP worked with Vijaya Kumaratunga and T. B. Ilangaratne in Hector Kobbekaduwa's presidential election campaign in 1982.

The party dissolved in 1983 and entered the SLFP.

1982 establishments in Sri Lanka
1983 disestablishments in Sri Lanka
Communist parties in Sri Lanka
Defunct political parties in Sri Lanka
Political parties established in 1982
Political parties disestablished in 1983
Political parties in Sri Lanka
Trotskyist organisations in Sri Lanka